Kochkurovo (Kočkur vele) is a rural locality (a selo) and the administrative center of Kochkurovsky District of the Republic of Mordovia, Russia. Population:

References

Notes

Sources

Rural localities in Mordovia
Kochkurovsky District
Saransky Uyezd